Ahmet Alper Görmüş (born 21 November 1952) is a Turkish journalist and writer, formerly a columnist for Taraf and Yeni Aktüel. He was the editor-in-chief of the news weekly Nokta (2006-7).

He was previously a contributor to Aydınlık (1977 - 1980), working outside journalism in a variety of roles after it was closed down following the 1980 Turkish coup d'état. He resumed journalism at Nokta (1986 - 1990), and was then editor-in-chief of Yeni Aktüel (1991 - 1995). He received the Hrant Dink International Award in 2009, with Amira Hass.

References 

1952 births
Living people
Turkish journalists
Turkish writers
People from Kars
Taraf people
Academic staff of Istanbul Bilgi University